The 2016 EBSA European Under-21 Snooker Championship is an amateur snooker tournament that took place from 7 February to 13 February 2016 in Wrocław, Poland.  It is the 20th edition of the EBSA European Under-21 Snooker Championships and also doubles as a qualification event for the World Snooker Tour.

The tournament was won by the 2014 runner-up Josh Boileau of Ireland who defeated England's Brandon Sargeant 6–1 in the final to win the championships. As a result, he was given a two-year card on the professional World Snooker Tour for the 2016/2017 and 2017/2018 seasons.

Results

Round 1
Best of 7 frames

References

2016 in snooker
Snooker amateur tournaments
Sport in Wrocław
2016 in Polish sport
International sports competitions hosted by Poland
February 2016 sports events in Europe